The Door to Doom is the twelfth studio album by Swedish doom metal band Candlemass, released on 22 February 2019 via Napalm. It is the band's first full-length studio album since 2012's Psalms for the Dead, marking their longest gap between studio albums, and the first one to feature vocalist Johan Längqvist since 1986's Epicus Doomicus Metallicus. Loudwire named it one of the 50 best metal albums of 2019.

Track listing

Personnel

Candlemass
 Johan Längqvist – vocals
 Mats "Mappe" Björkman – rhythm guitar
 Lars Johansson – lead guitar
 Leif Edling – bass
 Jan Lindh – drums

Additional musicians
 Tony Iommi – guitar solo 
 Jennie-Ann Smith – backing vocals
 Mats Levén – backing vocals
 Stefan Berggren – backing vocals
 Rickard Nilsson – keyboards 
 Carl Westholm – Mellotron 
 Andreas "Habo" Johansson – outro drums 
 Michael Blair – percussion

Production and design
 Marcus Jidell − production, recording
 Niklas Flyckt − mixing
 Svante Forsbäck − mastering
 Erik Rovanperä − artwork
 Beatrice Edling − layout
 Kinan Faham − photography

Charts

References

Candlemass (band) albums
2019 albums
Napalm Records albums